Oido is an island on the West Coast region of South Korea's Gyeonggi Province (also known as Gyeonggi-do). It is an area of Siheung stretching from north to south with low hills under .
Oido has shell mounds
throughout the whole area, with the largest of the mounds located on the West Coast. The Oido shell mounds are the only remains of the exchanges between the North and South Neolithic cultures of the Korean Peninsula. The mounds also provide information on the Neolithic area's changing coastal environment.

Oido Island first appeared in the Annals of King Sejong in 1448, and it is known that its name has changed in the order of Island-Ojildo. Along with the nearby Okgudo Island, it is also called Okgwi Island. The northeast of the island is a tidal flat that was used as a salt field until a large-scale reclamation project was carried out, and the northwest and southeast are rocky areas with steep slopes.

History
Important events in the history of Oido:

The Prehistoric Age and the Creation of Natural Community.
In 1018, it was reorganized to be Ansan-hyeon (安山縣).
The early years of the Joseon dynasty, called O-jil-ae-do (吾叱耳島), occurred during the reign of King Seongjong (1469-1494) in the Joseon Dynasty.
In 1757, Silla was incorporated into the Janggu-gun.
August 4, 1896 it was reorganized to be Ma-you meon, Ansan-gun and Gyeong-gi.
April 1, 1914 it was incorporated into Jeong-wang-li, Gun-ja-myeon and Si-heong-gun.
In 1940, it was renamed Ansan-gun(安山郡).
May 1, 1985 it was reorganized to be Ansan-gun and Incheon.
January 1, 1989 it was reorganized to be Jeong-wang-dong and Si-heong city.
During the reign of King Jeong-jo in the Joseon Dynasty, it was renamed to Oido the current name.
The Japanese Colonial Era set up a pond in this area so that the mud and salt returned to the land.
Construction of Military Forts.

Geography
Oido is not an island on the ocean, but people still refer to it as an "island."
Some parts of the northeast side of the island were occupied by the Japanese.
The Northwest and Southeast parts of Oido have steep rock slopes.

Transportation
Oido Station is the last station of Seoul Subway Line 4 and the Suin Line. It is about three minutes on foot from Oido Station. One can also take a bus.

Tourist attractions

Dinosaur Egg Fossil Place Visiting Center (공룡알 화석지 방문센터): In 1999, fossil dinosaur eggs were found around Wooeumdo(우음도) in the center of Sihwaho Lake (시화호). They were formed about 100 million years ago during the Cretaceous period of the Mesozoic Era. More than 200 dinosaur eggs were discovered, and the site was designated Natural Monument No. 414. It is valued for academic research and displays fossil exhibits and dinosaur models.
Oido's Shell Festival promotes the customs and flavors of the Oido people and its fishing village life to tourists. The festival is held on Oido's food culture street every October. Typical events of the festival include catching eels with one's bare hands and shell gathering. Many local dishes of Oido are for sale and it consists of seafood and local specialties. After the Si-heung city stopped funding the festival in 2014, the festival got smaller. Originally, the festival was held for 2 to 3 days but, the last festival lasted only one day and the number of tourists that came decreased from 20000 to 10000.
Ok-gu Park (옥구공원): Ok-gu Island had controlled visitors' access until 1998 because of the coastguard station. After 1998, Si-heung city made Ok-gu island an Eco-friendly park for families who live in the capital areas. Ok-gu Park opened in 2000 and is composed of 'Hometown Hill (고향마을)', 'Mugunghwa Hill (무궁화 마을)', Marsh Eco Park (갯벌체험광장) and Lotus Flower Complex (연꽃단지) among other sites. Ok-gu park held the 'Gyeong-gi gardening culture fair' in 2010.
Oido Commemorative Park (오이도기념공원) : The park is located at the starting point of Siwha Seawall. There are various attractions including an honorary monument, observatory, tideland education plaza, inline skating rink, bicycle rental and other facilities.
Oido Food Culture Street (오이도음식문화거리) : Gyeong-gi province designated Oido food culture street as a model food culture. The local dishes like sliced raw fish (활어회), noodle soup with clams (바지락칼국수) and roasted clams (조개구이) are popular.
Red Lighthouse (빨간등대).
Odio Marine Observatory(오이도 함상전망대): An observatory built on a ship off the coast of Oido, Siheung-si, Gyeonggi-do.
Siheung Oido Museum(시흥오이도박물관) : The museum offers an opportunity to understand the excavated artifacts of Siheung and experience the prehistoric life culture.
Historic Site of Oido, Siheung(시흥 오이도 유적): It is a site of the Neolithic Period located in Oido Island, Jeongwang-dong, Siheung-si, Gyeonggi-do. It is Historic Site No. 441. It is distributed in a wide area (about 8,000 m2) at the entrance to Oido Island, and is the largest shell mound on the west coast. It is a representative site of Korea's west coast region, which shows the flow of inter-Korean relations in the Neolithic culture of the Korean Peninsula, inter-Korean exchanges with inland areas, and the adaptation process of the Neolithic.

Gallery

See also
Siheung
Ansan
Oido Station

References

Former islands of South Korea
Islands of Gyeonggi Province
Siheung